The Clerget 16X was an experimental French 16-cylinder X engine built in about 1918.

Design
Clerget are best known for their well engineered rotary engines produced from 1911 to the end of World War I in 1918, the first of their type to deliver fuel-air mixture to the cylinder heads by external induction tubes via externally push rod operated inlet valves. They later made a series of static radial aircraft diesel engines.  The experimental 16X was a departure from all of these; despite contemporary descriptions as a radial engine, it was in more modern terms an X-type, four stroke water-cooled petrol engine, essentially two 90° V-8 cylinder engines, one inverted, coupled to a common output shaft.

Specifications

References

Bibliography

1910s aircraft piston engines
16X